Aoi Kizaki (born 13 March 1998) is a Japanese professional footballer who plays as a defender for WE League club Sanfrecce Hiroshima Regina.

Club career 
Kizaki made her WE League debut on 12 September 2021.

References 

Living people
1998 births
Japanese women's footballers
Women's association football defenders
Association football people from Saitama Prefecture
Sanfrecce Hiroshima Regina players
WE League players